Derrik Smits (born September 6, 1996) is an American-born basketball player of Dutch descent. He is the son of former basketball player Rik Smits.

College career
Smits played for the Valparaiso University men's basketball team from 2016 to 2019. He was forced to redshirt the 2015–16 season due to an injury, and began playing the following season at Valparaiso. He averaged 7.5 points and 3.6 rebounds per game as a sophomore. As a junior, Smits averaged 12.2 points and 5.7 rebounds per game, earning Missouri Valley Conference All-Most Improved Team honors. He graduated from Valparaiso in December 2018, taking graduate-level courses in the 2019 spring term to maintain his basketball eligibility; his graduation made him immediately eligible to transfer. Smits played his final season of college eligibility in 2019–20 at Butler University, choosing the Bulldogs over North Carolina State and Arizona State. He averaged 3.1 points and 1.7 rebounds per game for the Bulldogs.

Professional career
Smits signed his first professional contract with Real Valladolid in Spain for the 2020–21 season. On November 16, he asked for the termination of his contract for personal reasons.

References

1996 births
Living people
American men's basketball players
Butler Bulldogs men's basketball players
Centers (basketball)
Dutch men's basketball players
Valparaiso Beacons men's basketball players